Triphosa dubitata, the tissue, is a moth of the family Geometridae. The species was first described by Carl Linnaeus in his 1758 10th edition of Systema Naturae. It is found from north-west Africa across the Palearctic to Japan.

The wingspan is 38–48 mm. Adults are on wing from August to September depending on the location.

The larvae feed on bird cherry (Prunus padus), Rhamnus species (including alder buckthorn (Rhamnus frangula), buckthorn (Rhamnus cathartica) and ash (Fraxinus excelsior).

Subspecies
 Triphosa dubitata dubitata
 Triphosa dubitata amblychiles Prout, 1937

References

External links
 
 The tissue at UKMoths
 Fauna Europaea
 Lepiforum. e.V.

Rheumapterini
Moths described in 1758
Moths of Africa
Moths of Asia
Moths of Europe
Moths of Japan
Taxa named by Carl Linnaeus